Grandchester is a rural town and locality in the City of Ipswich, Queensland, Australia.

Geography

Although unofficial, the name persists in the road name, St Anne's Hidden Vale (Anglican church), Spicers Hidden Vale (a rural resort), and the Hidden Vale Wildlife Centre (jointly operated by the resort and the University of Queensland).

History
Grandchester was the initial terminus of the first narrow gauge mainline railway in the world. The first track opened to traffic on 31 July 1865 from Ipswich, as the Queensland Government was keen to prove the viability of its controversial 'pony railway'. The choice of Ipswich as the starting point for the first rail line in Queensland was a testament to the importance of Ipswich in early Queensland. Coal was needed for steam trains and Ipswich's port was an inland freight centre. In Ipswich, this first line skirted north around the river, running through North Ipswich to enter a two-storey iron station, then on to the Bremer River wharf. This wharf handled rail freight until a railway line joining Ipswich to Brisbane was opened in 1875.

The construction of the Victoria Tunnel through the Little Liverpool Range to the west of Grandchester was behind schedule, and so although it served a very small population, Bigges Camp (as it was initially known) became the terminus for 10 months, until the line was extended to Gatton. The original Grandchester railway station, including the former station master's residence, still exists.

The name Grandchester derives from the old English name for bigge (Grand) and camp (Chester), which was the initial name of the locality, and suggested by the wife of the Governor of the day when the railway opened.

Grandchester Post Office opened on 1 January 1866 after the arrival of the railway and closed in 1978.

Grandchester Provisional School opened in November 1870 in a tent borrowed from the Queensland Government. which closed after one month in December 1870. Granchester State School opened on 29 January 1878.

Hidden Vale Provisional School opened on 10 July 1916. On 1 September 1919, it became Hidden Vale State School. It closed on 15 February 1943. It was at 779-799 Hiddenvale Road.

On Sunday 18 July 1937, St Anne's Anglican Church was officially dedicated by Archdeacon H.W.H. Stevenson.

Grandchester Sawmills is one of the last known surviving steam-powered flat-belt sawmills in Australia. The engine powering it was manufactured in 1908, and the mill has been in operation from 1945. It was destroyed by a fire, sometime in the early hours of 6 May 2007. Work on the long process of restoring the mill to its former glory started almost immediately in the days following the fire. The mill is operating once again with work still continuing on the restoration. This will ensure that this important piece of history is preserved for the generations that follow.

Heritage listings 

Grandchester has a number of heritage-listed sites, including:
 Franklin Vale Road: Franklyn Vale Homestead
 Ipswich Road: Grandchester railway station
 Symes Street: Grandchester Sawmills

Education 
Grandchester State School is a government primary (Prep-6) school for boys and girls at School Road. In 2017, the school had an enrolment of 37 students with 6 teachers (3 full-time equivalent) and 5 non-teaching staff (3 full-time equivalent).

Amenities 
The Ipswich City Council operates a fortnightly mobile library service which visits the Grandchester Hotel.

St Anne's Anglican Church at 798 Hiddenvale Road holds monthly services. It is part of the Rosewood Anglican Parish.

See also 

 Rosewood
 Rail transport in Queensland
 Victoria Tunnel, Queensland

References

External links

 
 

 
Towns in Queensland
City of Ipswich
Localities in Queensland